Charles Beeson may refer to:

Charles H. Beeson  (1870–1949), American classical scholar
Charles Beeson (director), British television director